Calothamnus cupularis is a plant in the myrtle family, Myrtaceae and is endemic to the south-west of Western Australia. (In 2014 Craven, Edwards and Cowley proposed that the species be renamed Melaleuca arcuata.) It is a similar shrub to Calothamnus formosus but has larger flowers and fruit.

Description

The sepals have a thickened rib in their centre and wide papery margins.

Taxonomy and naming
Calothamnus cupularis was first formally described in 2010 by Alex George from a specimen found in the Kalbarri National Park. The specific epithet (cupularis) is Latin for "cup-like", referring to the shape of the fruits of this species.

Distribution and habitat
Calothamnus cupularis occurs in a small area in the Kalbarri National Park, in the Geraldton Sandplains biogeographic region where it grows in sand in kwongan.

Conservation
Calothamnus cupularis is classified as "priority 2" by the Western Australian government Department of Parks and Wildlife meaning that is poorly known and from one or a few locations.

References

cupularis
Myrtales of Australia
Plants described in 2010
Endemic flora of Western Australia